Mineplex is a Minecraft minigame server. It is one of seven Minecraft: Bedrock Edition servers officially partnered with Mojang Studios, the developers of Minecraft. As of mid-2016, Mineplex had millions of unique players monthly. At its peak, the server had around 20,000 concurrent players at almost any given time, and broke a Guinness World Records record on January 28, 2015, for having 34,434 concurrent players, the most on a Minecraft server at the time.

In Guinness World Records 2016: Gamers Edition, Mineplex was listed as the most popular Minecraft server network, having 34,434 players on the server at once on January 28, 2015. This record was lost to Hypixel the same year. Mineplex's popularity has been rapidly declining since its peak years, and now the Java Edition server averages around 20-150 players simultaneously, while its Bedrock Edition counterpart averages 4,000+ players.

History
Mineplex was founded and created on January 24, 2013, by Gregory Bylos and Spujell, known in Minecraft as "Sterling_", and "Spu_" respectively. The server is among the oldest Minecraft servers that are still running to this day. The server received large increases in players after YouTuber CaptainSparklez became part of the Ownership team and he would publish videos about the server. In June 2015 the server would break the record of most players online with 43,033 concurrent players. In 2016, the Dallas Mavericks partnered with Mineplex to create Dallas Mavericks World, a minigame for the server. According to a news release by the team, it will allow players to compete in building competitions and play a basketball minigame in a full-scale model of the American Airlines Center. The minigame was launched on the server in the summer of 2016 but ultimately failed due to Mineplex's partnership with Mojang Studios.

Guinness World Records

Features 
The server's main feature is its various minigames, specially customized and heavily modded multiplayer maps with different objectives. These minigames provide winnable gameplay mechanics to the sandbox game.

References

External links
 

Minecraft servers
Internet properties established in 2013